John Nicholas Maw (5 November 1935 – 19 May 2009) was a British composer. Among his works are the operas The Rising of the Moon (1970) and Sophie's Choice (2002).

Biography
Born in Grantham, Lincolnshire, Maw was the son of Clarence Frederick Maw and Hilda Ellen Chambers. He attended the Wennington School, a boarding school, in Wetherby in the West Riding of Yorkshire. His mother died of tuberculosis when he was 14. He attended the Royal Academy of Music on Marylebone Road in London where his teachers were Paul Steinitz and Lennox Berkeley. He then studied in Paris with Nadia Boulanger and Max Deutsch.

From 1998 until 2008, Maw served on the faculty of the Peabody Institute at Johns Hopkins University, where he taught music composition. He had previously served on the faculties of Yale University, Bard College, Boston University, the Royal Academy of Music, Cambridge University, and Exeter University.

Personal life

In 1960, Maw married Karen Graham, and they had a son and a daughter. Their marriage was dissolved in 1976. He took up residence in Washington, DC in 1984, living there with his companion Maija Hay, a ceramic artist, until his death. He died at home on 19 May 2009, at age 73, as a result of heart failure with complications from diabetes.

On Sunday 6 November 2011, BBC Radio 3 broadcast a 2-hour tribute called, "Nicholas Maw: A Celebration". The program featured performances of Maw's Violin Concerto, an orchestral suite drawn from his opera, Sophie's Choice, and two choral works (One foot in Eden still, I stand and Hymnus).

Compositions
Maw is best known for Scenes and Arias (1962) for three female voices and orchestra, the orchestral pieces Odyssey (1987) and The World in the Evening (1988), the guitar work Music of Memory (1989) and a violin concerto (1993) written for Joshua Bell. His music has been described as neo-romantic but also as modernist and non-tonal (for instance Personæ, his cycle of piano pieces).

In 2002, the opera Sophie's Choice (based on William Styron's novel) was commissioned by BBC Radio 3 and the Royal Opera House, Covent Garden. It was premièred at the Royal Opera House under the direction of Sir Simon Rattle, and afterwards received a new production by stage director Markus Bothe at the Deutsche Oper Berlin and the Volksoper Wien, which had its North American premiere by the Washington National Opera in October 2006. Mezzo-soprano Angelika Kirchschlager, who sang Sophie in London, reprised the role at the National Opera, joined by American baritone Rod Gilfry as Nathan Landau, the schizophrenic man who initially rescues Sophie and then persuades her to join him in a suicide pact. Maw also prepared a concert suite for orchestra based on the music.

Odyssey was performed in BBC's Maida Vale Studios on 9 December 2005, and was broadcast on BBC Radio 3 two days later. Rattle has also conducted a recording of the work with the City of Birmingham Symphony Orchestra.

Chronological list of compositions

 Eight Chinese Lyrics (1956) for mezzo-soprano
 Requiem (1956–57) for voices & orchestra
 Flute Sonatina (1957)
 Nocturne (1957) for mezzo-soprano & chamber orchestra
 Six Chinese Songs (1959) for contralto & piano
 Five Epigrams (1960) for chorus
 Our Lady's song (1961), carol for chorus
 Chamber Music (1962) for oboe, clarinet, horn, bassoon & piano
 Scenes and Arias (1962, rev. 1966) for soprano, mezzo-soprano, contralto and orchestra
 Round (1963) for children's voices, SATB chorus and piano
 The Angel Gabriel (1963), choral arrangement of Basque melody
 Bulalow (1964), carol for chorus
 One Man Show (1964, rev. 1966 & 1970), opera
 Arrangement of Corpus Christi Carol (1964) for sopranos and piano
 String Quartet No. 1 (1965)
 Severn Bridge Variation (1966) for a composite work with Malcolm Arnold, Michael Tippett, Alun Hoddinott, Grace Williams and Daniel Jones
 Sinfonia (1966) for chamber orchestra
 Six Interiors (1966) for tenor and guitar
 Sonata (1966) for strings and two horns
 The Voice of Love, Eight Peter Porter songs (1966) for mezzo-soprano & piano
 Double Canon for Igor Stravinsky on his 85th Birthday (1967)
 The Rising of the Moon (1967–70), three-act opera
 Concert Music from The Rising of the Moon (arr. 1972) for orchestra
 Epitaph-Canon in Memory of Igor Stravinsky (1971) for flute, clarinet & harp
 Five Irish Songs (1972) for chorus
 Personae I, II & III (1973) for piano
 Serenade for orchestra (1973, rev. 1977)
 Life Studies (1973–76) for fifteen strings
 Te Deum (1975) for treble or soprano, tenor, SATB chorus, congregation and organ
 Reverdie (1975), five songs for male voices
 Annes! (1976) for unaccompanied SATB chorus
 Nonsense Rhymes for Children (1976), 20 songs with piano accompaniment
 La Vita Nuova (1979), five songs for soprano and chamber ensemble
 The Ruin (1980) for SSAATTBB chorus and solo horn
 Flute Quartet (1981)
 Summer Dances (1981) for orchestra
 Night Thoughts (1982) for solo flute
 String Quartet No. 2 (1982)
 The Old King's Lament (1982) for solo double-bass
 Spring Music (1982–83) for orchestra
 Little Suite (1984) for solo guitar
 Sonata Notturna (1985) for cello & strings
 Personae IV, V & VI (1985–86) for piano
 Little Concert (1987) for oboe, two horns & strings
 Odyssey (1972-5, 1979, 1985-7) for orchestra
 Ghost Dances (1988), imaginary ballet for five players
 The World in the Evening (1988) for orchestra
 Five American Folksongs (1989) for voice & piano
 Music of Memory (1989, rev. 1991) for solo guitar
 Three Hymns (1989), for SATB chorus and organ
 Roman Canticle (1989, rev. 1991) for baritone, flute, viola & harp
 One Foot in Eden Still, I Stand (1990) for mixed chorus and optional organ
 Piano Trio (1990-1)
 American Games (1991) for wind orchestra
 Shahnama (1992) for chamber orchestra
 The Head of Orpheus (1992) for soprano & two clarinets
 Swetė Jesu (1992) for chorus
 Violin Concerto (1993)
 String Quartet No. 3 (1994)
 Dance Scenes (1994–95) for orchestra
 Voices of Memory (1995) for orchestra
 Hymnus (1995–96) for SATB chorus and orchestra
 Solo Violin Sonata (1996–97)
 Stanza (1997) for solo violin
 Narration (2001) for solo cello
 Intrada (2001) for string quartet
 Sophie's Choice (1999-2002), four-act opera based on the William Styron novel
 Concert Suite from Sophie's Choice (2003) for orchestra with optional mezzo-soprano
 Tango from Sophie's Choice (2004) for solo guitar
 Fanfare (2004) for brass ensemble
 Concerto for Cor Anglais and Orchestra (2004)
 String Quartet No. 4 (2005)
 String Sextet (2007)

Works lists may be found online.

References

Further reading

External links
 Extended biography
 Nicholas Maw: A Recent Discography and Music Review
 Guardian December 2002 article
 Nicholas Maw - Daily Telegraph obituary
"British Composer Brought 'Sophie's Choice' to Opera Stage", The Washington Post, 20 May 2009
Interview with Nicholas Maw, 13 July 1995

1935 births
2009 deaths
20th-century classical composers
English classical composers
English emigrants to the United States
Johns Hopkins University faculty
People from Grantham
People from Washington, D.C.
Alumni of the Royal Academy of Music
Peabody Institute faculty
Yale University faculty
Bard College faculty
EMI Classics and Virgin Classics artists
Boston University faculty
Academics of the Royal Academy of Music
Academics of the University of Cambridge
Academics of the University of Exeter
21st-century classical composers
Pupils of Lennox Berkeley
English male classical composers
20th-century English composers
20th-century British male musicians
21st-century British male musicians